The Candid Candidate is a 1937 Fleischer Studios animated short film starring Betty Boop and Grampy.

Synopsis
Betty Boop campaigns for Grampy for Mayor, and wins by one vote (despite the fact the town's paper says it's a landslide). However, he later finds out the job isn't as glamorous as he thought. Nonetheless, he helps solve some of the city's issues, such as building a free bridge on the river, creating a public automatic root beer stand, etc., and the townspeople love him.

References

External links
 The Candid Candidate on Youtube.
 
 The Candid Candidate at IMDb.

1937 short films
Betty Boop cartoons
1930s American animated films
American black-and-white films
1937 animated films
Paramount Pictures short films
Fleischer Studios short films
Short films directed by Dave Fleischer
1930s English-language films
American comedy short films
American animated short films
Films about old age
Films about American politicians